Reekers is a Dutch surname, and may refer to:

 Darron Reekers (born 1973), Dutch cricket player
 Edward Reekers (born 1957), Dutch singer
 Hendrik Reekers (1815–1854), Dutch painter
 Johan Reekers (born 1957), Dutch Paralympian
 Peter Reekers (born 1981), Dutch footballer
 Rob Reekers (born 1966), Dutch footballer and football manager

Dutch-language surnames